Keith Van Eron is a retired American soccer goalkeeper who played one season in the American Soccer League and three in the North American Soccer League.  He also played the first eleven seasons of Major Indoor Soccer League, winning the 1984 championship with the Baltimore Blast.  He was the 1986 MISL Goalkeeper of the Year.

Player
Van Eron attended Hartwick College where he played soccer under Timo Liekoski.  He had originally intended to play basketball at Hartwick, but joined the soccer team.  He was a 1976 Honorable Mention (third team) All American.  In 1977, Van Eron turned professional with the New York Apollo in the American Soccer League.  He immediately proved his worth by being named a first team all star.  The Apollos sold his contract to the Houston Hurricane, coached by Liekoski, of the North American Soccer League, two games into the 1978 season.  He played nineteen games for an 8–11 record before the Hurricane acquired Paul Hammond from the Tampa Bay Rowdies.  The team then benched Van Eron and went 1–8 under Hammond.  That fall, he signed with the Cincinnati Kids of the newly established Major Indoor Soccer League.  Although he played one last outdoor season, in the fall of 1980, he moved indoors permanently when he signed with the Wichita Wings.  In January 1981, the Wings traded him to the Philadelphia Fever.  He moved to the Baltimore Blast in the fall of 1981 and would remain with the team until 1988, except for one season with the Las Vegas Americans.  In February 2008, he was inducted into the Baltimore Blast Hall of Fame.

Personal
Van Eron currently owns a company which specializes in holding soccer camps for youth players.

The US release of Microprose Soccer (1988), probably the most popular soccer game for the Commodore 64 computer, was called Keith Van Eron's Pro Soccer

Yearly Awards
 ASL First Team All Star:  1977
 MISL Goalkeeper of the Year: 1986

References

External links
NASL/MISL stats

1955 births
Living people
Sportspeople from Brooklyn
Soccer players from New York City
American soccer players
American Soccer League (1933–1983) players
Baltimore Blast (1980–1992) players
Cincinnati Kids players
Hartwick Hawks men's soccer players
Houston Hurricane players
Las Vegas Americans players
Major Indoor Soccer League (1978–1992) players
New York United players
North American Soccer League (1968–1984) indoor players
North American Soccer League (1968–1984) players
Philadelphia Fever (MISL) players
Philadelphia Fury (1978–1980) players
Wichita Wings (MISL) players
Association football goalkeepers
New York Apollo players